Lygodactylus pauliani is a species of gecko, a lizard in the family Gekkonidae. The species is endemic to Madagascar.

Etymology
The specific name, pauliani, is in honor of French entomologist Renaud Paulian.

Geographic range
L. pauliani is found in southeastern Madagascar.

Habitat
The natural habitats of L. pauliani are forest, grassland, rocky areas, and shrubland.

Reproduction
L. pauliani is oviparous.

References

Further reading
Glaw F, Vences M (1994). A Fieldguide to the Amphibians and Reptiles of Madagascar, Second Edition. Cologne, Germany: Vences & Glaw Verlag / Serpents Tale. 480 pp. . (Lygodactylus pauliani, p. 284).
Krüger, Jens (2001). "Die madagassischen Gekkoniden. Teil II. Die Geckos der Gattung Lygodactylus Gray 1864 (Reptilia: Sauria: Gekkonidae)". Gekkota 3: 3-28. (in German).
Pasteur G, Blanc CP (1991). "Un lézard parthénogénétique à Madagascar? Description de Lygodactylus pauliani sp. nov. (Reptilia: Gekkonidae)". Bulletin du Muséum National d'Histoire Naturelle, Paris 13 (1-2): 209–215. (Lygodactylus pauliani, new species). (in French).
Röll, Beate; Pröhl, Heike; Hoffmann, Klaus-Peter (2010). "Multigene phylogenetic analysis of Lygodactylus dwarf geckos (Squamata: Gekkonidae)". Molecular Phylogenetics and Evolution 56 (1): 327–335.
Rösler H (2000). "Kommentierte Liste der rezent, subrezent und fossil bekannten Gekkotaxa (Reptilia: Gekkonomorpha)". Gekkota 2: 28–153. (Lygodactylus pauliani, p. 94). (in German).

Lygodactylus
Reptiles described in 1991
Reptiles of Madagascar
Endemic fauna of Madagascar
Taxa named by Charles Pierre Blanc